All Inclusive may refer to:

 All Inclusive (2008 film), a Chilean-Mexican film
 All Inclusive (2011 film), a Russian film
 All Inclusive (2014 film), a Danish film
 All Inclusive (2019 film), a French film
 All-inclusive resort, a type of vacation resort